Kampong Limau Manis is a village in the south-west of Brunei-Muara District, Brunei. The population was 1,097 in 2016. It is one of the villages within Mukim Pengkalan Batu, a mukim in the district. It is home to an important archaeological site in the country, dating back to the 10th century AD.

Name 
 is the Malay name which translates as "Limau Manis Village". The village is said to be named after a citrus tree grown at a riverbank in the village which was deemed special as it bore very sweet fruits, hence the name  (lit. 'sweet citrus'). The riverbank then is said to have had a jetty and the place was then named , and the village was eventually named after the jetty.

Archaeology 
The village is home to Sungai Limau Manis archaeological site which has unearthed the largest and richest archeological finding in the country. It was discovered in 2002 and has unearthed Chinese ceramics artefacts, mainly dating back to the Song (960–1279) and Yuan (1271–1368) dynasties. The  site has since been gazetted under the 1967 Antiquities and Treasure Trove Act.

History 
According to the local oral tradition, the area and its vicinity were once home to a non-Muslim indigenous people and in the 15th century ruled by a leader named Raja Lumbi. The oral tradition also mentioned of a fight between the said leader with his followers, and a group of Muslim inhabitants led by a Muslim missionary named Sharif Mohammad or Sharif Alwi.

The present-day village is believed to have existed since 200–250 years ago, and the initial inhabitants were said to be the Murut and Bisaya ethnic groups, followed by the Kedayan people. Their primary economic activities were agriculture and collecting forest products.

The village was formerly part of the district of Limau Manis (also known as Ulu Brunei), before being merged with other districts to become the present-day Brunei-Muara District.

Facilities 
The village primary school is Panglima Barudin Primary School.

Kampong Limau Manis Mosque is the village mosque; it was built in 1994 and can accommodate 1,200 worshippers.

The village is home to Pengkalan Batu Health Centre, the community health centre for the residents of Mukim Pengkalan Batu.

References 

 

Limau Manis